Anja Henriëtte Meulenbelt (born 6 January 1945 in Utrecht) is a Dutch writer and former politician of the Socialist Party (SP).

She wrote De Schaamte Voorbij (The Shame is Over), published in 1976, which was an important piece of second-wave feminist writing in the Netherlands. The novel was confessional in tone, and made the connection between the body and language politics overt. She also wrote several books about the Palestinians.

She was a Senator from 2003 to 2011.

In August 2014, Meulenbelt terminated her membership of the SP, because she felt the party did not speak out enough against Israel's military actions in the Gaza Strip.

Electoral history

References

External links 
 
  Biography at Parlement & Politiek

1945 births
Living people
Dutch feminists
Dutch non-fiction writers
Members of the Senate (Netherlands)
Palestinianists
Politicians from Utrecht (city)
Socialist Party (Netherlands) politicians
Dutch socialist feminists
University of Amsterdam alumni